Xyphon is a genus of leafhoppers in the family Cicadellidae. There are at least seven described species in Xyphon.

Species
 Xyphon flaviceps (Riley, 1880) c g b (yellow-headed leafhopper)
 Xyphon fulgidum (Nottingham, 1932) c g
 Xyphon gillettei (Ball, 1901) c g
 Xyphon nudum (Nottingham, 1932) c g
 Xyphon reticulatum Signoret, 1854 c g b (bermudagrass leafhopper)
 Xyphon spadice Catanach & Dietrich, 2013 c g
 Xyphon triguttatum (Nottingham) c g b
Data sources: i = ITIS, c = Catalogue of Life, g = GBIF, b = Bugguide.net

References

Further reading

External links

 

Cicadellidae genera
Cicadellini